The 1936 Ohio gubernatorial election was held on November 3, 1936. Incumbent Democrat Martin L. Davey defeated Republican nominee John W. Bricker with 52.02% of the vote.

General election

Candidates
Major party candidates
Martin L. Davey, Democratic
John W. Bricker, Republican 

Other candidates
Andrew R. Onda, Communist

Results

References

1936
Ohio
Gubernatorial